Vratnik Pass is a mountain pass in the Balkan Mountains (Stara Planina) in Bulgaria. It connects Elena and Sliven.

Mountain passes of Bulgaria
Balkan mountains
Landforms of Veliko Tarnovo Province
Landforms of Sliven Province